The Windows Installer CleanUp Utility (MSICU.exe, MSICUU.exe, MSICUU2.exe) was a software utility for the Microsoft Windows operating system designed to solve uninstallation problems of programs that use the Windows Installer technology. It looks up registry references and files related to Windows Installer that were installed by various programs, and forcibly wipes invalid entries out. It works in all 32-bit and 64-bit versions of Microsoft Windows.

Microsoft first released the utility in 1999 to help Windows-based computers clean up installed programs that would either refuse or pretend not to remove themselves from the "add/remove programs" feature in Microsoft Windows.

The utility only changes registry values and files associated with Windows Installer and does not remove any files associated with installed programs. Only users who have logged in as system administrators may run the utility.

For developers who have problems with the Windows Installer automatically repairing their own installations on developer machines (when the developer has manually updated some of the binaries), this utility is ideal to remove the Windows Installer information whilst leaving the actual installation intact.

Microsoft retired the Windows Installer CleanUp utility on June 25, 2010, due to conflicts with Microsoft Office 2007. A Program Install and Uninstall Troubleshooter for Windows 7, Windows 8, Windows 8.1 and Windows 10 was instead made available.

References

External links
 

Windows components
Utilities for Windows